The Vĩnh Tuy Bridge is a bridge over the Red River in Hanoi which was completed 2008. It was one of the Millennial Anniversary of Hanoi commemorative projects along with the Thanh Trì Bridge.

It is unrelated to a smaller Vĩnh Tuy bridge destroyed in 1966 by United States Air Force bombing.

References

 

Bridges in Hanoi
Hong River
Millennial Anniversary of Hanoi
Bridges completed in 2008
2008 establishments in  Vietnam
21st century in Hanoi